Karen White is a New York Times bestselling American author of more than twenty-five novels.

Life and career 
White was born in Tulsa, Oklahoma, and during her childhood lived in numerous states and also in Venezuela and London, England, where she graduated from The American School in London.  She attended college at Tulane University in New Orleans, Louisiana, where she obtained a Bachelor of Science in Management.

Most of White's novels are based in the low-country of the southeastern United States. Her first book, In the Shadow of the Moon was a double finalist for the Romance Writers of America RITA Award. The Girl on Legare Street reached The New York Times Best Seller list in November 2009. On Folly Beach, published in May 2010, was also a NYT bestseller.  White has published 27 novels to date, with the latest book, The Attic on Queen Street, released in November 2021. In addition to her solo work, White has also has co-authored four novels with Beatriz Williams and Lauren Willig; the most recent, The Lost Summers of Newport, was released in  May 2022.

White is married to Timothy J. White, a US banker, with two children, and resides near Atlanta, Georgia. White is currently published by Berkley, a division of Penguin Random House.

Bibliography

Stand alone novels 
In the Shadow of the Moon August 2000 
Whispers of Goodbye October 2001 
Falling Home June 2002 
After the Rain April 2003 
Blessings of Mossy Creek June 2004 
The Color of Light June 2005 
Pieces of the Heart April 2006 
Learning to Breathe March 2007 
The Memory of Water March 2008 
The Lost Hours April 2009 
On Folly Beach May 2010 
The Beach Trees May 2011 
Sea Change June 2012 
The Time Between June 2013 
A Long Time Gone June 2014 
The Sound of Glass May 2015 
Flight Patterns May 2016 
The Night the Lights Went Out April 2017 
Dreams of Falling June 2018

Tradd Street series 
The House on Tradd Street November 2008 
The Girl On Legare Street November 2009 
The Strangers on Montagu Street November 2011 
Return to Tradd Street January 2014 
The Guests on a South Battery January 2017 
The Christmas Spirits on Tradd Street October 2019 
The Attic on Queen Street November 2021

Collaborative novels 

 The Forgotten Room (with Lauren Willig and Beatriz Williams) January 2016 
 The Glass Ocean (with Lauren Willig and Beatriz Williams) September 2018 
All the Ways We Said Goodbye (with Lauren Willig and Beatriz Williams) January 2020 
The Lost Summers of Newport (with Lauren Willig and Beatriz Williams) May 2022 ISBN 978-0-063-04074-8

References

External links

Living people
20th-century American novelists
21st-century American novelists
American romantic fiction writers
American women novelists
Writers from Tulsa, Oklahoma
Tulane University alumni
Novelists from Georgia (U.S. state)
20th-century American women writers
21st-century American women writers
Novelists from Oklahoma
Year of birth missing (living people)